"If It Ain't Love (Let's Leave It Alone)" is a single originally recorded by American country music artist Connie Smith. Released in July 1972, the song reached #7 on the Billboard Hot Country Singles chart. The song was issued onto Smith's second studio album of 1972 entitled If It Ain't Love and Other Great Dallas Frazier Songs. In addition, "If It Ain't Love (Let's Leave It Alone)" peaked at #14 on the Canadian RPM Country Tracks chart around the same time.

In 1985, American country group The Whites recorded and released a cover version of "If It Ain't Love (Let's Leave It Alone)". The group's version peaked at #12 on the Billboard Hot Country Songs & Tracks chart. The song was later released on their 1985 album entitled Whole New World. In addition, the single peaked at #22 on the Canadian RPM Country Tracks chart around the same time.

Chart performance

Connie Smith

The Whites

References 

1972 singles
1985 singles
Connie Smith songs
The Whites songs
Songs written by Dallas Frazier
Song recordings produced by Bob Ferguson (musician)
Song recordings produced by Ricky Skaggs
1972 songs
MCA Records singles
RCA Records singles